Cephalotaxus, commonly called plum yew or cowtail pine, is a genus of conifers comprising 11 species, treated in either the Cephalotaxaceae, or in the Taxaceae when that family is considered in a broad sense. The genus is endemic to eastern Asia, though fossil evidence shows it had a wider Northern Hemisphere distribution in the past. The species are evergreen shrubs and small trees reaching  (rarely to ) tall.

Taxonomy 
Molecular studies place Cephalotaxus as the most basal member of the Taxaceae, having a very ancient divergence from them during the late Triassic.

Description

The species can be either monoecious or dioecious; when monoecious, the male and female cones are often on different branches. Natural dispersal is thought to be aided by squirrels which bury the seeds for a winter food source; any seeds left uneaten are then able to germinate.

Phytochemistry
Cephalotaxus species produce cephalotaxine, an alkaloid. Parry et al 1980 provides evidence that cephalotaxine is a phenylethylisoquinoline. However, they also find this genus to be unable to incorporate cinnamic acid into cephalotaxine, and incorporation of cinnamic acid is usually a step in phenylethylisoquinoline syntheses, throwing the phenylethylisoquinoline theory in to question.

Extant species
The taxonomy of Cephalotaxus is difficult, because the species have been defined using characteristics that intergrade with each other, such as the length and shape of needles, bark, and stomatal band color. Cephalotaxus species have often been separated geographically rather than morphologically.

References

External links
Gymnosperm Database
Photos: Cephalotaxus fortunei, Cephalotaxus koreana

 
Conifer genera